The Detroit Mercy Titans men's soccer program represents the University of Detroit Mercy in all NCAA Division I men's college soccer competitions. Founded in 1987, the Titans compete in the Horizon League. The Titans Coach is  Nate Kopunek, who joined the team on March 6, 2023, replacing Coach Deren. Titans plays their home matches at Titan Field, on the Detroit Mercy campus.

Coaching history 

University of Detroit Mercy has had four coaches in their program's existence. Records through 2022 season.

Seasons

NCAA Tournament history 

Detroit Mercy have appeared in one NCAA Tournaments. Their sole appearance came in 1996.

Rivalries 

Detroit's primary rival is the Oakland Grizzlies. Both programs compete in the Horizon League and are separated by 15 miles. Detroit also has intra-conference rivalries with Wright State and Cleveland State.

Individual honors

National honors

All-Americans 
No player from the program has been named an All-American.

Conference honors 

The following players have earned Horizon League individual honors.

 Horizon League Player of the Year
 1996: Tim Blackwell
 1997: Jorge Ferreira
 2005: Andrew Ornoch
 2012: Adam Bedell
 Horizon League Men's Soccer Tournament Most Valuable Player
 1995: Dominic Vella
 1996: Jeff Thomas
 Horizon League Newcomer of the Year
 1993: Kal Kaliszewski
 1995: Jorge Ferreira
 1997: Marcel Flemming
 2010: Ya Ya Toure
 Horizon League Offensive Player of the Year
 2005: Andrew Ornoch
 2012: Adam Bedell
 Horizon League Defensive Player of the Year
 2005: Jason Massoglia
 Horizon League Goalkeeper of the Year
 2005: Sasha Bošković

Team honors 
 Horizon League Regular Season
 Winners (3): 1995, 2005, 2012
 Runners-up (3): 1993, 1997, 2014
 Horizon League Men's Soccer Tournament
 Winners (1): 1996
 Runners-up (5): 1993, 1995, 1999, 2004, 2005

Notes

References

External links
 

 
1987 establishments in Michigan
Soccer clubs in Detroit
Association football clubs established in 1987